Serhiy Knyazev (born 18 October 1971) is a Ukrainian official who served as Chief of Ukraine's National Police from 8 February 2017 until 25 September 2019.

Career
In 1992 Knyazev started working for the police in his birthplace Bila Tserkva. In 1995 he switched to the criminal police there and became its head in 2008. Knyazev was promoted to leading the criminal investigation department of the Kyiv metropolitan region in 2008.

After the start of the War in Donbass in 2014 Knyazev was transferred to Donetsk. In November 2014 he became deputy chief of Donetsk Oblast Police Region and head of the criminal police. He took part in the Battle of Debaltsevo. In December 2014 he was awarded the Order of Danylo Halytsky "for courage and heroism in defending the sovereignty and territorial integrity of Ukraine."

After the July 2015 Mukacheve shootout between the police and Right Sector Knyazev was transferred to lead the Zakarpattia Oblast Police. From April until November 2016 he was transferred to Rivne Oblast to combat illegal amber mining. Starting in November 2016 Knyazev was appointed head of the Criminal Investigation Department of the National Police of Ukraine. On 8 February 2017 he was appointed as the overall head of the National Police of Ukraine. Knyazev tendered his resignation on 24 September 2019 during a press conference, one day after his ex-wife was caught at the Polish border with her employer Vadym Kahan and 500,000 euros. The next day the Cabinet of Ministers approved the resignation and replaced him with Ihor Klymenko, who previously was Knyazev's Deputy Head of the National Police.

On 26 September 2019 Knyazev was appointed an official adviser to the Minister of Internal Affairs, Arsen Avakov.

Personal life
Knyazev divorced Viktoriya in 2012. She is the mother of their three children.

References

External links
Biography  on "VSE"-website (dated 5 April 2016)

1971 births
Living people
Recipients of the Order of Danylo Halytsky
Ukrainian police officers